Tim Müller (born 4 August 1996) is a German-Austrian footballer who plays as a midfielder for TSV Schott Mainz.

References

External links
 
 

German footballers
Association football midfielders
1. FSV Mainz 05 II players
TSV Steinbach Haiger players
3. Liga players
Sportspeople from Mainz
1996 births
Living people
Footballers from Rhineland-Palatinate